Attention Shoppers! is the third studio album by the American hard rock band Starz, released in 1978.

The album peaked at No. 105 on the Billboard 200.

Production
The album was recorded at Secret Sound, and was produced by the band.

Track listing

Personnel
Starz
Michael Lee Smith - lead vocals, percussion, guitar
Richie Ranno - guitar, backing vocals
Brendan Harkin - guitar, backing vocals, percussion
Pieter "Pete" Sweval - bass, vocals
Joe X. Dubé - drums, percussion, synthesizer

Production
Jack Malken, Michael Barry - engineers
Bob Ludwig - mastering at Masterdisk, New York City

References

External links
Official band website
Interview with Richie Ranno
Interview with Starz guitarist Richie Ranno

1977 albums
Starz (band) albums
Capitol Records albums